Yongzheng Dynasty is a 1999 Chinese historical television series starring Tang Guoqiang and Jiao Huang. The series, spanning 44 episodes, occupied the CCTV-1 prime time slot; after its premiere, there have been many re-runs of the show on television networks in mainland China, Taiwan and Hong Kong. The series was adapted from Eryue He's historical novels, which are loosely based on historical events in the reigns of the Kangxi and Yongzheng Emperors in the Qing dynasty (1644–1911). The series was followed by a 2001 prequel, Kangxi Dynasty, and a 2002 sequel, Qianlong Dynasty, both of which were also based on Eryue He's novels.

Yongzheng Dynasty was one of the most watched television series in mainland China in the 1990s and remains one of the "classics" among Chinese historical television dramas. It is among the highest rated CCTV-1 prime time historical dramas in history. The series roughly covers Chinese history from 1705, some 15 years prior to the Yongzheng Emperor's accession to the throne, to the emperor's death in 1735. About one third of the content is devoted to the struggle among the Kangxi Emperor's sons for the succession to their father's throne.

Yongzheng Dynasty received critical acclaim. The major themes covered in the series include loyalty and betrayal, fratricide, political corruption, and the centralisation of power.

Plot
Towards the end of the reign of the Kangxi Emperor (r. 1661–1722) in the Qing dynasty, the emperor's talented and ambitious sons vie for the coveted throne. Palace intrigue is rife as complex networks of loyalty emerge in the battle for succession. Eventually, the Fourth Prince, Yinzhen, emerges victorious; he becomes known as the Yongzheng Emperor. Many people are surprised as to why the Kangxi Emperor chose Yinzhen over his other likely heirs: Second Prince Yinreng, who has been Crown Prince for almost 40 years; Third Prince Yinzhi, who excels in literary arts; Eighth Prince Yinsi, who has a reputation for being virtuous; 14th Prince Yinti, the warrior-prince favoured by his father.

Yinzhen, who is nicknamed "Stern Prince", was not seen as a strong candidate by the imperial court to succeed his father. Previously, he had incited victims of natural disasters in Jiangnan to create a disturbance; to help these victims, he prepared a "Feast at Hong Gate" to extort more than two million silver taels from rich merchants and provincial officials; in pursuing imperial treasury debts, he forced a senior official to commit suicide and caused nobles to sell their assets on the streets; he watched his brothers compete with each other until they were exhausted before he joined the fray; he used Nian Gengyao to cause Yinreng to lose his position as Crown Prince in a corruption scandal, however, superficially, he maintained good relations with Yinreng. In the ensuing struggle after Yinreng is removed for a second time as Crown Prince, the Kangxi Emperor scolds Yinsi for vying for the throne, and orders Yinxiang to be imprisoned. The Kangxi Emperor then appoints Yinti as border pacification general-in-chief.

As the ailing Kangxi Emperor lies on his deathbed, he assembles seven of his sons to his deathbed, including Yinsi and Yinzhen. Prior to their father's death, Yinzhen releases Yinxiang from captivity and sends him to take control of Fengtai Commandery on the outskirts of Beijing. The Kangxi Emperor speaks to Yinzhen in private, telling him he intends to pass on the throne to him, then dies. Longkodo reads the Kangxi Emperor's final edict and declares Yinzhen the new Emperor.

The Yongzheng Emperor's rule was seen as authoritarian and vigorous, but efficient. Upon ascending the throne, he made Yinsi and Yinxiang his top advisors. His first priority was to pursue debts owed to the state treasury by officials. He meted out harsh punishments to officials found guilty of corruption and bribery. He also used the confiscated assets and properties from corrupt officials to finance disaster relief efforts and his military campaigns in northwestern China. He grows distant to some of his most trusted advisers, including Nian Gengyao and Longkodo. Both Nian and Longkodo eventually fall out of the emperor's favour. The emperor's 13th brother Yinxiang dies while his eighth brother Yinsi and ninth brother Yintang are expelled from the imperial clan and become commoners.

In 1735, the hardworking Yongzheng Emperor dies suddenly from what appears to be over-exhaustion. He is succeeded by his son, Hongli, who becomes known as the Qianlong Emperor. Before Hongli becomes the emperor, the Yongzheng Emperor forces another of his sons, Hongshi, to commit suicide so as to prevent Hongshi from fighting with Hongli for the throne.

Cast
Main cast

 Tang Guoqiang as Yinzhen, the Fourth Prince who became the Yongzheng Emperor
 Jiao Huang as the Kangxi Emperor
 Xu Min as Yinreng, the Second Prince who was Crown Prince for two terms
 Wang Huichun as Yinsi, the Eighth Prince
 Wang Hui as Yinxiang, the 13th Prince
 Du Yulu as Zhang Tingyu
 Jiang Guangyu as Hongshi, Yinzhen's third son
 Du Zhiguo as Nian Gengyao
 Zhao Yi as Li Wei
 Cai Hongxiang as Longkodo
 He Shengwei as Tian Wenjing

Other cast
 Note: Some cast members played multiple roles.

 Liao Bingyan as Tong Guowei
 Shi Jianlan as Empress Dowager Renshou
 Xu Zuming as Yinti, the 14th Prince
 Miao Haizhong as Yintang, the Ninth Prince
 Zhang Yanchun as Yinzhi, the First Prince; also, as Instructor Hu
 Xia Heping as Yinzhi, the Third Prince
 Liu Ke as Yin'e, the Tenth Prince
 Hu Ronghua as Tulišen
 Zhuang Li as Empress Xiaojingxian
 Jia Zhigang as Hongli, Yinzhen's fourth son
 Yang Haofei as Hongli (young)
 Yuan Shilong as Hongzhou, Yinzhen's fifth son

Historical accuracy
Yinsi-related
The series over-emphasised Yinsi in a villainous role, ostensibly for dramatic effect. The series showed Yinsi as much more "in control" of the situation than he actually was. Historically, the Yongzheng Emperor scapegoated Yinsi more than the other way around. Furthermore, Yinsi had fallen out of favour with the Yongzheng Emperor by the second year of the emperor's reign (1724), and died in captivity two years later, but in the series he was portrayed to have died shortly before the Yongzheng Emperor. 
Historically, Yinsi did not propose an "Eight Princes Regency", nor did he propose to force the hand of the Yongzheng Emperor through controlling the military in the capital. He also did not liaise with iron-cap princes for the purpose of deposing the Yongzheng Emperor. All the "iron-cap" princes involved in the 'palace coup' episode are fictional, as their names do not appear in historical records.
The series made repeated references to Yinsi being created a qinwang (first-rank prince) by the Kangxi Emperor, when, in reality, he was only a beile until the Yongzheng Emperor came to the throne. Historically, the Yongzheng Emperor made Yinsi a qinwang on the day after his coronation.
Other princes
Yintang was sent to the northwest ostensibly to aid military activity on the frontiers shortly after Yinzhen's accession; in the series this move is portrayed as a means to check Nian Gengyao, but in reality the purpose of this trip was to distance Yintang from potential conspiracies with Yinsi.
Empress Xiaogongren, the mother of the Yongzheng Emperor and Yinti, died in June 1723, due to sudden illness, less than six months after her son became emperor. In the series it appears in the middle of the Yongzheng Emperor's reign. 
Hongshi died at age 23 in 1727, likely due to being forced to commit suicide, though historians do not uniformly agree on the cause of his death. 1727 was the fifth year of the Yongzheng era, meaning that Prince Bao (Hongli) was heir presumptive for most of the Yongzheng era. In the series, Hongshi was shown to have died nearing the end of the Yongzheng era after having plotted to kill Hongli, none of which was backed by any historical evidence. 
Officials
Historically, Li Wei was never Governor of Jiangsu, nor Viceroy of Liangjiang, as he was portrayed in the series. He served Governor of Zhejiang, then Viceroy of Zhili in the later years of the Yongzheng era. However, historically, one of Li Wei's major achievements was the implementation of the replacement of the head tax with a land tax.
Wu Sidao was on the staff of Tian Wenjing and was never known to have liaised privately with Yinzhen. In the series, Wu Sidao was portrayed as a major mastermind during Yinzhen's struggle for the throne, serving Yinzhen directly.
While Zhang Tinglu did serve historically as a head administrator of the imperial examinations, he was not executed for conspiring to leak the contents of the exam. In fact, he served with distinction until the early years of the Qianlong era.
Neither the official historical record, which was likely doctored in the Yongzheng Emperor's favour, nor any unofficial histories, stipulate Zhang Tingyu as being present during the delivery of the will of the late emperor. Apart from this detail, the series mostly stayed true to the official histories of the Qing dynasty. A rough consensus among historians was that the "seven princes receiving the will" version of events was concocted by Yinzhen and his supporters after the silencing of his political rivals. More likely, the only significant figures tending to the Kangxi Emperor in his final days were Longkodo and Yinzhen himself.
Personal
In the series, the Yongzheng Emperor is shown to have died due to exhaustion from overwork. Most historians agree that the cause of death was more likely his overdosing on what he thought to be an elixir for eternal life. His death also occurred rather suddenly; that is, he was not suffering from any known chronic illness. Historians believe that the emperor had become obsessed searching for such an elixir both before and after his ascension to the throne.
Qiao Yindi, depicted as a lover of both Yinti and the Yongzheng Emperor, is an entirely fictional character

Soundtrack
The music for the series was composed by Xu Peidong.

 De Minxin Zhe De Tianxia (得民心者得天下; The One Who Wins the Hearts of the People Gains the Empire) performed by Liu Huan
 Mutong (牧童; Shepherd Boy) performed by Xu Peidong
 Shengong (深宫; Inner Palace)
 Qingzhai (情债; Emotional Debt)
 Shangchao (上朝; Attending Court)
 Chuzheng (出征; Embarking on a Military Campaign)
 Qingyuan (情缘; Predestined Romance)
 Shijian (事件; Incident)
 Shenmi (神秘; Mysterious)
 Qingshang (情殇; Dead Romance)
 Minsu (民俗; Popular Custom)
 Qingyuan (情怨; Emotional Blame)
 Xingdong (行动; Action)
 Kaixuan (凯旋; Triumphant Return)
 Shiguan (史观; Historical Perspective)

Awards and nominations

 17th Golden Eagle Television Awards (1999)
 Outstanding Drama
 Outstanding Lead Actor (Tang Guoqiang)
 Outstanding Supporting Actor (Jiao Huang, Wang Huichun)
 Best Screenplay
 Best Art Direction
 Best Editing
 Best Music
 Best Theme Song

 19th Flying Sky Television Awards (1999)
 Best Drama
 Best Actor (Jiao Huang)
 Best Screenplay
 Best Art Direction
 Best Music

References

External links
 

1999 Chinese television series debuts
Television series set in the Qing dynasty
Mandarin-language television shows
Television shows based on Chinese novels
Chinese historical television series
Television series set in the 18th century